Carl Perkins (August 16, 1928 – March 17, 1958) was an American jazz pianist.

Biography
Perkins was born in Indianapolis but worked mainly in Los Angeles. He is best remembered for his performances with the Curtis Counce Quintet, which also featured Harold Land, Jack Sheldon and drummer Frank Butler. He also performed with Tiny Bradshaw, Big Jay McNeely in 1948-49, and played dates with Miles Davis in 1950. Following a short stint in the Army (January 1951 to November 1952), he worked intermittently with the Oscar Moore Trio (1953-1955) and the Clifford Brown–Max Roach group in 1954. He recorded with Frank Morgan in 1955, and with his own group in 1956. Perkins composed the standard "Grooveyard".

His playing was influenced by his polio-affected left arm, which he held parallel to the keyboard. He used his elbow to play deep bass notes. He was thus known as "the crab".

He died of a drug overdose at age 29, in Los Angeles, California. He recorded one album, Introducing Carl Perkins, and a short series of singles under his own name. Authors Paul Tanner, Maurice Gerow, and David Megill cite Perkins as one of the best "funky", or hard bop, piano players, but his early death prevented him from leaving a legacy.

Discography

As leader
"Summertime" b/w "Lullaby in Rhythm" (Savoy, 1949) Single, with Edwin Perkins (b), Herb Williams (d)
"The Rosary" b/w "Ave Maria" (Savoy, 1949) Single, with unknown bass and drums
"Smoke Gets in Your Eyes" b/w "I'll Never Smile Again" (Savoy, 1949) Single, with unknown bass and drums
Introducing Carl Perkins (Dootone, 1956) Perkins's only album as leader. With Leroy Vinnegar (b), Lawrence Marable (d)

Shared leadership
Jazz Pianists Galore (Pacific, 1957) Perkins plays on one track
Piano Playhouse (Mode, 1957) Perkins plays four solo tracks; others are by Jimmy Rowles, Lou Levy, Paul Smith, Gerald Wiggins

As sideman
With Pepper Adams
Pepper Adams Quintet (Mode, 1957)With Chet Baker and Art PepperPlayboys (Pacific Jazz, 1956) With Clifford Brown and Max RoachThe Best of Max Roach and Clifford Brown In Concert! (GNP, 1954)With Curtis CounceThe Curtis Counce Group (Contemporary, 1956)
You Get More Bounce with Curtis Counce! (Contemporary, 1957)
Carl's Blues (Contemporary, 1957)With Buddy DeFrancoPlays Benny Goodman (Verve, 1957)
Wholly Cats (Verve, 1957)
Closed Session (Verve, 1957)
I Hear Benny Goodman and Artie Shaw (Verve, 1957)With Victor FeldmanVic Feldman on Vibes (Mode, 1957)With Dizzy GillespieJazz Recital (Norgran, 1955)With Dexter GordonDexter Blows Hot and Cool (Dootone, 1955)With Jim HallJazz Guitar (Pacific Jazz, 1957)With Illinois JacquetCollates (Clef, 1951)
Illinois Jacquet and His Orchestra (Verve, 1956)With Richie KamucaRichie Kamuca Quartet (Mode, 1957)With Harold LandHarold in the Land of Jazz originally titled as Grooveyard (Contemporary, 1958)With Oscar MooreOscar Moore Trio (Skylark, 1954)With Frank MorganFrank Morgan (Gene Norman Presents, 1955)With Art PepperThe Complete Art Pepper Aladdin Recordings (Blue Note, 1957) The Perkins recordings were released long after recordingWith Stuff SmithHave Violin, Will Swing (Verve, 1957)With Leroy Vinnegar'Leroy Walks!'' (Contemporary, 1958)

References

External links
Comprehensive Carl Perkins Discography
Curtis Counce featuring Perkins

1928 births
1958 deaths
Musicians from Indianapolis
20th-century American pianists
American jazz pianists
American male pianists
Bebop pianists
Drug-related deaths in California
People with polio
West Coast jazz pianists
20th-century American male musicians
American male jazz musicians